Siskiwit Lake is a small eutrophic lake on the Bayfield Peninsula in Bayfield County in northern Wisconsin in the United States. Parts of the small town of Bell border the lake, and there are several houses and vacation cabins on the lake, most on the north shore.

The lake contains a  island, Long Island (another small quasi-island, Round Island, is actually attached to the mainland). The deeper part of the lake is to the east, with a long narrow bay stretching northwest of Long Island. The lake drains at the eastern end into the Siskiwit River which flows (via Little Siskiwit Lake) into Siskiwit Bay at Cornucopia.

Siskiwit Lake is used for fishing. Northern pike Panfish is present. Walleye is present in abundance. Also present are Smallmouth Bass, Bluegill,  Crappie, Pumpkinseed, Sucker, and Yellow Perch, and Brook Trout. There is a boat ramp.

References

Siskiwit
Lakes of Bayfield County, Wisconsin